Eshqabad may refer to:

Hamadan Province
Eshqabad, Hamadan, a village

Isfahan Province
Eshqabad, Isfahan, a village in Isfahan County

Kerman Province
Eshqabad, Kerman, a village

Kurdistan Province
Eshqabad, Kurdistan, a village

Mazandaran Province
Eshqabad, Mazandaran, a village

North Khorasan Province
Eshqabad, North Khorasan, a village

Razavi Khorasan Province
Eshqabad, Razavi Khorasan, a city in Nishapur County
Eshqabad, Chenaran, a village in Chenaran County
Eshqabad, Fariman, a village in Fariman County
Eshqabad, Mashhad, a village in Mashhad County
Eshqabad, Mazul, a village in Nishapur County
Eshqabad (Eyshabad), Mazul, a village in Nishapur County
Eshqabad, Sarvelayat, a village in Nishapur County
Eshqabad-e Kohneh, a village in Nishapur County
Eshqabad Rural District, in Razavi Khorasan Province

South Khorasan Province
Eshqabad, South Khorasan, a city in Tabas County
Eshqabad, Birjand, a village in Birjand County
Eshqabad, Boshruyeh, a village in Boshruyeh County
Eshqabad, Qaen, a village in Qaen County

Tehran Province
Eshqabad, Tehran, a village

West Azerbaijan Province
Eshqabad, West Azerbaijan, a village

Yazd Province
Eshqabad, Taft, a village in Taft County

See also
Eshaqabad (disambiguation)